Cherukole  is a village in Pathanamthitta district in the state of Kerala, India.

Demographics
 India census, Cherukole had a population of 13,048 with 6,200 males and 6,848 females.

See also
 Ranni
 Keekozhur
 Pathanamthitta district

References

Villages in Pathanamthitta district